Skinny House may refer to:

 Skinny House (Boston), Massachusetts, US 
 Skinny House (Long Beach), California, US
 Skinny House (Mamaroneck, New York), US

See also
Spite house
75½ Bedford St, New York
Pie house
Smallest house in Amsterdam
Smallest House in Great Britain
Casa Scaccabarozzi